Haimen (Qihai dialect: ,) is a district of Nantong, Jiangsu province, with a population of approximately 1 million. It is located at the opposite side of the Yangtze River to Shanghai and is directly north of Chongming Island except for a small portion that forms Haimen District's Haiyong Town. Haimen is the seat of the Roman Catholic Diocese of Haimen. Haimen is located in the poorer north Jiangsu region and together with Qidong City, traditionally has one of the highest rates of liver cancer in China and in the world, with upwards of 1 out of every 10 adults in the rural areas dying from liver cancer.

History
The area that is now Haimen was formed from silt deposits from the Yangtze River. Several sandbanks, including Dongzhou and Buzhou, joined with the mainland in the Tang dynasty. In 958 CE, during the Later Zhou dynasty in the Five Dynasties and Ten Kingdoms period, Haimen County was established with the county seat at Dongzhou Town. At this time, Haimen and Jinghai District were merged into the newly formed Tongzhou District.

Because the mouth of the Yangtze River moved northward during the Ming dynasty, Haimen has dealt with flooding that destroyed parts of the county, including Lüsi, Yudong, and Sijia.

In 1672, under the Kangxi Emperor of the Qing dynasty, the seat moved to Jinghai Township. Starting from 1701, the river's course moved south, creating more than 40 new sandbanks. In 1768, the county became an independent subprefecture with the seat moving to Maojia Town.

In 1912, one year after the Republic of China was founded, Haimen once again became a county. However, in 1949, when the People's Republic of China was founded, Haimen became governed under Nantong Prefecture. Once county-level governments started to reappear in 1983, Haimen was reinstated as a county, and in June 1994, Haimen became a county-level city.

In 2020, Haimen became a district of Nantong.

Geography

Climate
According to the Köppen climate classification system, Haimen has a humid subtropical climate (Cwa). This means that Haimen experiences four distinct seasons; the summers are hot and the winters are cold. The summers are rainier than the other seasons, and the summer rains usually bring flooding.

January is the coldest month, and July is the hottest month.

Parks 

 Jianghai garden

Administrative divisions
Haimen is divided into twenty-one towns and one township, the pene-exclave of Haiyong on Chongming. These towns are further divided into 231 villages and three fish villages.

21 towns 

1 township
 Haiyong
- It is only township and its area  is 9 km2 (3.5 sq mi). It is pene-enclave on Chongming Island, most of which belongs to Shanghai.

Transport
With easy access to the Sea and Yangtze River, transportation is very convenient. Less than 2 hours driving distance to Shanghai Pudong International Airport, about 40 mins driving distance to Nantong Xingdong Airport and Nantong Railway Station, which has high speed bullet train. There are multiple entries to the national Highway system, e.g. G40 Expressway.
Close to Port of Nantong, Haimen is currently developing its own county level sea port in DongZaoGang town. There is an easy access to Sutong Yangtze River Bridge to cross the Yangtze, as well as ferry service.

Haimen railway station opened in 2019 as an intermediate stop on the Nanjing–Qidong railway.

References

External links
 Regional topographical map
 行政区划 (Administrative Divisions of Haimen)
 地理位置 (Geography of Haimen)
Haimen City English guide (Jiangsu.NET)
 "Illustrated Album of Yangzhou Prefecture", from 1573 to 1620, has illustrations of Haimen

Cities in Jiangsu
958 establishments
Populated places on the Yangtze River
Nantong
10th-century establishments in China